Sir John A. Macdonald Collegiate Institute (equally known to as Sir John A. Macdonald CI, SJAM, Macdonald Collegiate or Mac , originally known as O'Sullivan Secondary School, is a secondary school in Toronto, Ontario, Canada. It is located in the L'Amoreaux neighbourhood of the former suburb of Scarborough It is operated by the Toronto District School Board and previously by the Scarborough Board of Education. The school's motto is "Prudentia et Scientia" (Vision and knowledge).

History
Sir John A. Macdonald Collegiate Institute was designed by the architectural firm, Gordon S. Adamson and Associates. The school building, originally named O'Sullivan Secondary School, was constructed in 1963 and opened in the fall of 1964 when there was only farmland around it, and as the population in the area grew, so did the school. During construction, O'Sullivan was renamed to Sir John A. Macdonald Collegiate Institute, after Canada's first prime minister, John A. Macdonald, in which the colors red, black, white and purple were chosen, with the latter color taken from the $10 Canadian banknote.

As its eleventh collegiate, the school's main building was then extended to have more classrooms, along with larger rooms used for music, art, and autoshop. MacDonald celebrated its 50th year on September 26, 2014.

Notable alumni
 Mike Johnson, retired NHL Hockey player (with the Toronto Maple Leafs, Tampa Bay Lightning, Phoenix Coyotes, Montreal Canadiens, and St. Louis Blues)
 David Furnish, filmmaker/director/producer and husband of Elton John
 Eric McCormack, actor, producer and musician, star of TV series Will and Grace
 Mike Myers, comedian and Hollywood movie actor (attended Macdonald, but graduated from Stephen Leacock C.I.)
 Duff Gibson, 2006 Winter Olympics gold medalist in singles skeleton; firefighter with Calgary International Airport
 William Blair, former Chief of Police of the Toronto Police Service and Minister of Border Security and Organized Crime Reduction
 Shaun Chen, former Toronto District School Board Trustee (Ward 21) and current Member of Parliament for Scarborough North
 Michelle MacPherson, 1984 Summer Olympics bronze medalist, 1982 Commonwealth Games double bronze medallist and gold medal relay, swimming
 Brad Park, retired NHL player (with the New York Rangers, Boston Bruins, and Detroit Red Wings), member of the Hockey Hall of Fame; briefly coach with the Red Wings
 Barbara Gowdy, novelist and short story author
 Michael Rudder, Canadian stage, film and voice actor, survived shooting in Mumbai, India
 Mike Levine, bass player for Triumph
 Sherko Haji Rasouli, football player for the BC Lions
 Rod Connop, CFL All-Star and Canadian Football Hall of Fame inductee
 John Anderson, retired NHL hockey player (with the Toronto Maple Leafs, Quebec Nordiques, Hartford Whalers)

See also
List of high schools in Ontario

References

External links
 http://schoolweb.tdsb.on.ca/johnamacdonald/Home.aspx
 http://www.tdsb.on.ca/Findyour/Schools.aspx?schno=4154

Educational institutions established in 1964
Schools in the TDSB
High schools in Toronto
Education in Scarborough, Toronto
1964 establishments in Ontario
John A. Macdonald